Between the Assassinations is the second book published by Aravind Adiga though it was written before his first book The White Tiger. The title refers to the period between the assassination of Indira Gandhi in 1984 and the assassination of her son, Rajiv Gandhi, in 1991. Indira Gandhi was the serving Prime Minister of India when she was assassinated; Rajiv Gandhi became Prime Minister in 1984, and left office following his party's defeat in the 1989 general election.

Between the Assassinations is a collection of short stories. It was published by Picador in India in 2008, and in Britain and the United States in 2009. While it reveals the beauty of the rural, coastal south where it is set, its subject is the pathos, injustices and ironies of Indian life.

The book had an initial print run of 16,000 copies, which is on the higher side for fiction in India.

Overview
The stories take place in the fictitious town of Kittur in Karnataka, Southwest India. It was originally modeled on Adiga's hometown of Mangalore but was substantially changed to make room for more diverse plots and characters. The stories revolve around different classes, castes and religions in India. In each story, another set of characters is introduced, but places and names appear again in other stories.

Even though it was published after The White Tiger, Between the Assassinations was started—and most likely finished—before The White Tiger. The servant who is tempted to run away with his master's money, the village hick sent to town, Nepali guards and a hit-and-run accident by a rich man, which is subsequently covered up by corrupt policemen, all appear in Between the Assassinations as well as in The White Tiger.

Contents
Arriving in Kattur: on the coast, halfway between Goa and Calicut, the city recommends staying 'a minimum of a week'
Day One (Morning): The Railway Station Ziaddin started working at a tea-and-samosa shop and claimed to be a Pathan, then he worked as a porter at the railway station where he starts working for a stranger, counting the trains carrying soldiers towards Calicut.
How the Town is Laid Out: the geographical center is the Angel Talkies, a pornographic cinema on Umbrella Street used as its reference point.
Day One (Afternoon): Bunder :Abbasi was the manager of a shirt factory, he closed it as his stitching employees were being made blind, but was forced to reopen it. He also struggled about the corruption he sees everywhere but could find no way out...
Day Two (Morning): Lighthouse Hill Ramakrishna (known as 'Xerox') sells counterfeit books, the police periodically arrest him and then release him. He plans that day to only sell The Satanic Verses by Salman Rushdie.
Day Two (Afternoon): St Alfonso's Boys' High School and Junior College :Shankar is a rich mixed-caste Brahmin-Hoyka student who sets off a small bomb in the school, and he hates caste-system. He then admits that he planted the bomb but is not believed.
Day Two (Evening): Lighthouse Hill (The Foot of the Hill) On Martyrs' Day the pupils were expecting to watch a free film the following Sunday, arranged by the government. One of the cinemas showed pornography but covered the explicit posters, then the teacher Mr D'Mello falls and dies, uncovering the images.
Day Three (Morning): Market and Maidan Two brothers, Keshava and Vittal arrive at the Market. Vittal works at a shop, Keshava works at barber and then moves to work on the buses and becomes a conductor. Then Keshava falls from the bus and has a head injury from which he never fully recovers.
The History of Kittur: The city was mentioned in 1091; vanished during the twelfth century; was famed by Yusuf Ali for curing lepers in the fourteenth century; in 1649 the Portuguese drove out the Mohameddans; in 1799 the East India took over the town...
Day Three (Afternoon): Angel Talkies Unmarried Gururaj lives in the YMCA and is the deputy editor of Kittur's Dawn Herald. One night he talks to a security guard who tells him that his newspaper just spreads the policy line of the powers that be.  Gururaj is determined to reveal the truth of the stories.
The Language of Kittur: Kannada is the official language, Tulu is a regional language which no longer has a written script, Konkani comes originally from Goa and is used by the Gaudi-Saraswat Brahmin.
Day Four (Morning): Umbrella Street Cycle-cart puller Chenayya struggles to deliver goods from a furniture shop on Umbrella Street, but he sees no way to escape.
Day Four (Afternoon): The Cool Water Well Junction :Soumya and her younger brother Raju beg and walk miles to obtain 'Smack' that her father needs.
Kittur: Basic Facts: Population (1981 census) 193,432 - Caste and religious breakdown
Day Five (Morning): Valencia (To the First Crossroads) Devout Hindu Jayamma was the eighth daughter of the family so had no dowry and never married. Instead for forty years Jamyamma had to clean and cook in other people's houses. She was now the cook of the advocate but initially had heated arguments with the other Christian servants...
Day Five (Evening): The Cathedral of Our Lady of Valencia George D'Souza worked by the cathedral spraying mosquitos, he was then noticed by Mrs. Gomes who asked him to be her gardener, and then her chauffeur. He then convinced her to take his sister Maria to be her cook. Then one evening George got drunk with arrack and he and his sister were dismissed.
Day Six (Morning): The Sultan's Battery Ratna sold white pills, showing photographs of disabilities caused by venereal diseases. He then discovered that his potential son-in-law also suffered from the disease. Ratna revealed that the pills did not work, and then tries to find a cure for him...
Day Six (Evening): Bajpe Giridhar Rao and Kamini were childless and lived at the edge of the city. Every week their friends visited as Kamini always prepared lavish food. The group was eclectic but every week when they left they worried about the couple.
Day Seven: Salt Market Village Comrade Thimmu was the leader of the Communist Party of India (Marxist-Maoist) in Kittur. An old woman's husband had hung himself, and she asked if the party could provide her daughter with a dowry. 50-year-old Murali was the deputy of the party but realised that he may be able to marry the girl...
Chronology: marks the years between the two assassinations.

References

https://web.archive.org/web/20100913072217/http://www.tehelka.com/story_main40.asp?filename=hub270908Takingheart.asp

Books by Aravind Adiga
2008 novels
Novels set in Karnataka
Novels set in the 1980s